Avelin is a commune in the Nord department in northern France.

The village's name is of Germanic origin.

Population

Heraldry

See also
Communes of the Nord department

References

Communes of Nord (French department)
French Flanders